Guatemala will compete at the 2014 Summer Youth Olympics, in Nanjing, China from 16 August to 28 August 2014.

Medalists
Medals awarded to participants of mixed-NOC (Combined) teams are represented in italics. These medals are not counted towards the individual NOC medal tally.

Archery

Guatemala qualified a female archer from its performance at the American Continental Qualification Tournament.

Individual

Team

Basketball

Guatemala qualified a boys' team based on the 1 June 2014 FIBA 3x3 National Federation Rankings.

Skills Competition

Boys' Tournament

Roster
 Anthony Guerra
 Juan Rosales
 Jose Tuchan
 Jeferson Urrutia

Group Stage

Beach Volleyball

Guatemala qualified a boys' and girls' team by winning the NORCECA AFECAVOL Zone Qualifier.

Cycling

Guatemala qualified a boys' and girls' team based on its ranking issued by the UCI.

Team

Mixed Relay

Equestrian

Guatemala qualified a rider.

Gymnastics

Artistic Gymnastics

Guatemala qualified one athlete based on its performance at the 2014 Junior Pan American Artistic Gymnastics Championships.

Girls

Judo

Guatemala qualified one athlete based on its performance at the 2013 Cadet World Judo Championships.

Individual

Team

Modern Pentathlon

Guatemala qualified one athlete based on its performance at the PANAM YOG Qualifiers and another based on the 1 June 2014 Olympic Youth A Pentathlon World Rankings.

Shooting

Guatemala qualified one shooter based on its performance at the Americas Qualification Event held during a Shooting World Cup event in Fort Benning.

Individual

Team

Swimming

Guatemala qualified one swimmer.

Girls

References

2014 in Guatemalan sport
Nations at the 2014 Summer Youth Olympics
Guatemala at the Youth Olympics